Les plus grands succès de Céline Dion (meaning Céline Dion's Greatest Hits) is the first French-language greatest hits album by Canadian singer Celine Dion, released in Quebec, Canada on 17 September 1984. It was a charitable album, which benefited the Quebec Cystic Fibrosis Association.

Content
On 17 September 1984 in the Centre hospitalier universitaire Sainte-Justine Dion launched Les plus grands succès de Céline Dion. It was sold in the Steinberg's supermarkets and part of the profits benefited the Quebec Cystic Fibrosis Association. The album did not include any new songs. None of Mélanie songs was included either. Les plus grands succès de Céline Dion contained all Dion's earlier singles, except "L'amour viendra".

Track listing

Release history

References

External links
 

1984 greatest hits albums
Albums produced by Eddy Marnay
Celine Dion compilation albums
Albums produced by René Angélil